Hellinsia scribarius is a moth of the family Pterophoridae. It is found in Colombia and Ecuador.

The wingspan is 20 mm. The forewings are pale brown ochreous and the markings are brown. The hindwings and fringes are pale brown ochreous. Adults are on wing in December, at altitudes from 2,200 to 3,840 meters.

References

Moths described in 1926
scribarius
Pterophoridae of South America
Fauna of Ecuador
Moths of South America